The FIBA European Super Cup was a professional men's basketball club competition that was held by FIBA. It took place between 1983 and 1991. It was played between the winners of the European-wide top-tier level league, the FIBA European Champions Cup (now called EuroLeague), and the winners of the European-wide secondary level league, the FIBA European Cup Winners' Cup (later called FIBA Saporta Cup).

Results

Titles by club

Titles by nation

See also
FIBA Europe SuperCup Women
Rosters of the top basketball teams in European club competitions

References

External links
FIBA Europe Official website

 
Defunct basketball cup competitions in Europe
International club basketball competitions
Recurring sporting events established in 1986
1986 establishments in Europe
1989 disestablishments in Europe